Bjørn Tysdahl (20 October 1933 – 17 December 2020) was a Norwegian literary historian.

He grew up in Kampen, Oslo. He took his education at the University of Oslo, from 1961 as a research fellow. Following the doctoral thesis Joyce and Ibsen: A Study in Literary Influence, he worked at the University of Sussex before becoming a professor of English literature at the University of Oslo. He was especially known for his biography on Oscar Wilde. He was a fellow of the Norwegian Academy of Science and Letters from 1988.

He resided at Hosle. He died in December 2020, aged 87.

References

1933 births
2020 deaths
Norwegian literary historians
University of Oslo alumni
Academics of the University of Sussex
Academic staff of the University of Oslo
Norwegian expatriates in England
Henrik Ibsen researchers
Members of the Norwegian Academy of Science and Letters